24 Squadron may refer to:

No. 24 Squadron RAF
No. 24 Squadron RAAF
No. 24 Squadron PAF, Pakistan Air Force
24 Squadron SAAF